Jeppe Breum Laursen is a Danish singer-songwriter and producer. Performing under the name "Senior", Laursen was the lead vocalist of the pop duo Junior Senior. In 2008 the British magazine Dazed & Confused praised Laursen's music for its "urgency and club appeal" and described it as "industrial synth-pop and bone-rattling drama". His first solo release was a collaboration with American electronic music duo Classixx entitled "I'll Get You", which was released in 2009 on Kitsuné. Laursen's song "Lucky Boy" was a contender for Denmark's entry for the 2009 Eurovision Song Contest. Laursen also remixed "Off Our Backs" by American electropop band MEN in 2010.

Laursen co-wrote and co-produced Lady Gaga's 2011 single "Born This Way", the title track from her second studio album of the same name. The song reached number one on the Billboard Hot 100 on 16 February 2011.

Personal life

Laursen is openly gay.

Discography
Original production
Classixx – "I'll Get You" featuring Jeppe (2009, Kitsuné Records) 
Lady Gaga – "Born This Way" (2011, Interscope Records)

Remix work
MEN – "Off Our Backs" (Jeppe's Money is a Major Issue Remix) (2010, IAMSOUND Records)

References

External links

Danish male singer-songwriters
Danish record producers
Living people
21st-century Danish male singers
Danish gay musicians
Gay singers
Danish LGBT singers
Danish LGBT songwriters
Gay songwriters
Year of birth missing (living people)